is a Japanese composer and multi-instrumentalist. He  mainly plays guitar, turntables, and electronics.

He first came to international prominence in the 1990s as the leader of the experimental rock group Ground Zero, and has since worked in a variety of contexts, ranging from free improvisation to noise, jazz, avant-garde and contemporary classical. He is also a pioneering figure in the EAI-scene, and is featured on important records on labels like Erstwhile Records. He has composed music for many films, television dramas, and commercials. In 2017, Otomo became the 2nd Guest Artistic Director of The Sapporo International Art Festival 2017.

Biography

Early years
Otomo was born in Yokohama in 1959, but due to his father's job, moved to Fukushima when he was nine years old. In high school, he frequented jazz cafés and started his own band. After entering university, he began studying under the improvisational jazz guitarist, Masayuki Takayanagi. He began performing around the world and released his first album in 1991 in Hong Kong. It was when the music he composed for a 1994 Hong Kong film was well received at the Cannes Film Festival that he also began to work as a composer.

Film and television
Otomo has composed music for a number of films and television programs, including Naoki Kato's Abraxas, Tsuyoshi Inoue's The Town's Children, and Ryuichi Hiroki's Yellow Elephant. He composed the music for the 2013 NHK morning television drama Amachan and it became his most commercially successful work up to that point. The soundtrack for Amachan reached number 5 on the Oricon Albums Chart, and Kyōko Koizumi's version of the song Shiosai no Memorī from the drama, composed by Otomo, reached number 2 on the Oricon Singles Chart. He performed live on New Year's Eve at the 2013 Kōhaku Uta Gassen.

Selected discography

Studio albums
 Otomo Yoshihide (1987)
 Problem (1988)
 Duo (1989) with Junji Hirose
 Silanganan Ingay (1989) with Junji Hirose
 No Problem (1990) with No Problem
 Who Is Otomo Yoshihide? (1991)
 Visions of Japan (1991) with Yuji Katsui and Hiroshi Higo
 Ground-0, No. 0 (1991)
 Terminal-Zero (1991)
 We Insist? (1992)
 Turntables Solo (1992)
 Memory Disorder (1993)
 Peril (1993) with Peril
 The Night Before the Death of the Sampling Virus (1993)
 Ground Zero (1993) with Ground Zero
 Early Works 1: 81-85 (1994)
 Monogatari: Amino Argot (1994) with Carl Stone
 Balance of Power: Variety (1994) with Hiedaki Sasaki
 All at Once at Any Time (1994) with David Moss and John King
 Multiverse (1994) with Peril
 Null & Void (1995) with Ground Zero
 Tatakiuri (1995) with Jon Rose
 Revolutionary Pekinese Opera (1995) with Ground Zero
 Revolutionary Pekinese Opera, Version 1.28 (1996) with Ground Zero
 Duo Improvisation (1996) with Yasuhiro Otani
 p53 (1996) with p53
 Twins!! (1996) with Bob Ostertag
 Ututu: Doppo Jukyo-at no Ho e Atelier El Sur (1996) with Kiwao Nomura and Keiki Midorikawa
 My Dear Mummy (1997) with Masahiko Shimada
 Memory & Money (1997) with Les Sculpteurs de Vinyl
 Conflagration (1997) with Ground Zero
 Consume Red (1997) with Ground Zero
 Plays Standards (1997) with Ground Zero
 Sound Factory (1997)
 Melted Memory (1997)
 Vinyl Tranquilizer (1997)
 Filament 1 (1998) with Filament
 Consummation (1998) with Ground Zero
 Gravity Clock (1998) with I.S.O.
 Memory Defacement (1998)
 Television Power Electric (1999) with Jim Baker, Aeron Bergman, Todd Carter, Brent Gutzeit, Michael Hartman, Ernst Long, and R. Wilkus
 Filament 2: Secret Recordings (1999) with Filament
 I.S.O. (1999) with I.S.O.
 Bits, Bots and Signs (1999) with Voice Crack
 Metal Tastes like Orange (1999) with Masahiko Okura, Günter Müller, and Taku Sugimoto
 Cathode (1999)
 Plays the Music of Takeo Yamashita (1999)
 Four Focuses (1999) with Martin Tétreault, Yasuhiro Otani, and Sachiko M
 21 Situations (1999) with Martin Tétreault
 Panty Christ (1999) with Justin Bond and Bob Ostertag
 Pilgrimage (1999) with Microcosmos
 Without Kuryokhin (1999) with Kenny Millions
 Moving Parts (2000) with Christian Marclay
 Music for Dance Art Hong Kong's "Memory Disorder" (2000)
 Anode (2001)
 Flutter (2001) with Otomo Yoshihide's New Jazz Quintet
 29092000 (2001) with Filament
 Thumb (2002) with Keith Rowe, Oren Ambarchi, Sachiko M, and Robbie Avenaim
 Ensemble Cathode (2002)
 Les Hautes Solitudes: A Philippe Garrel Film: Imaginarry Soundtrack (2002) with Taku Sugimoto and Sachiko M
 Miira ni Naru made: German Version (2002) with Masahiko Shimada
 Pulser (2002) with Otomo Yoshihide's New Jazz Quintet
 Invisible Architecture No. 1 (2002) with Philip Jeck and Martin Tétreault
 Ajar (2002) with Almá Fury, Yasuhiro Otani, and Xavier Charles
 Dreams (2002) with Otomo Yoshihide's New Jazz Ensemble
 Tails Out (2003) with Otomo Yoshihide's New Jazz Quintet
 ONJQ + OE (2003) with Otomo Yoshihide's New Jazz Quintet and Tatsuya Oe
 ONJQ + OE: Short Density (2003) with Otomo Yoshihide's New Jazz Quintet and Tatsuya Oe
 Turntables and Computers (2003) with Nobukazu Takemura
 Studio—Analogique—Numérique (2003) with Martin Tétreault
 Time Travel (2003) with Günter Müller
 Warholes or All Andy Would Enjoy (And Fear) / Warhol Memory Disorder (2003) with Lengow, Heyermears, and Sachiko M
 Soup (2003) with Bill Laswell and Yasuhiro Yoshigaki
 Loose Community (2003) with Park Je Chun and Mi Yeon
 The Crushed Pellet (2003) with Eiichi Hayashi and Yoshisaburo Toyozumi
 Turntable Solo (2004)
 Compositions for Guitars Vol. 2 (2004) with Tetuzi Akiyama, Toshimaru Nakamura, and Taku Unami
 Brackwater (2004) with Korber, Tomas, eRikm, and Toshimaru Nakamura
 Good Morning Good Night (2004) with Sachiko M and Toshimaru Nakamura
 Intonarumori Orchestra (2004) with Intonarumori Orchestra
 Filament Box (2004) with Filament
 1. Grrr (2004) with Martin Tétreault
 2. Tok (2005) with Martin Tétreault
 3. Ahhh (2005) with Martin Tétreault
 4. Hmmm (2005) with Martin Tétreault
 Out to Lunch (2005) with Otomo Yoshihide's New Jazz Orchestra
 See You in a Dream (2005) with Yuki Saga
 Trace Cuts (2005) with eRikm, Martin Tétreault
 Otomo Yoshihide's New Jazz Orchestra (2005) with Otomo Yoshihide's New Jazz Orchestra
 Time Magic City (2006) with BusRatch
 Episome (2006) with Bill Laswell and Tatsuya Yoshida
 Sora (2007)
 Prisoner: A Film by Adachi Masao: Original Soundtrack (2007)
 Multiple Otomo (2007)
 Encounter (2007) with Itaru Oki
 Modulation with 2 Electric Guitars and 2 Amplifiers (2007)
 Modulation with 2 Electric Guitars and 2 Amplifiers: Alternative Version (2008)
 Core Anode (2008)
 Country Kill (2008) with Joy Heights
 Les Archives Sauvées des Eaux (2008) with Luc Ferrari
 Guitar Duo (2008) with Seiichi Yamamoto
 Sweet Cuts, Distant Curves (2008) with Choi, Joonyong, Hong Chulki, and Sachiko M
 Monte Alto Estate (2009) with Sim
 Guitar Duo x Solo (2009) with Shinichi Isohata
 Shinjuku Crawl (2009) with The Thing
 Good Cop Bad Cop (2009) with Derek Bailey, Tony Bevan, and Paul Hession
 Ultra Miracle Love Story (2009)
 Book from Hell (2010) with Zai Kuning and Dickson Dee
 3-Part In(ter)ventions (2012) with Jim O'Rourke
 Piano Solo (2013)
 Existence (2013) with Shinichi Isohata
 Quintet/Sextet (2013) with Sachiko M, Evan Parker, John Butcher, John Edwards and Tony Marsh,

Live albums
 Live at Aketa-no-mise in Tokyo, July 28, 1989 (1989)
 Solo Live in Kyoto 93 (1995)
 Revolutionary Pekinese Opera, Tokyo 1995 (1995) with Ground Zero
 Live! (1995) with Eye Yamatsuka
 Live!! (1996) with Eye Yamatsuka
 Session 18 Oct. 1997 (1998) with Seed Mouth
 Live at Otis! (1998) with Sachiko M and Yoshimitsu Ichiraku
 Live (1998) with I.S.O.
 Last Concert (1999) with Ground Zero
 Guitar Solo Live 1 (1999)
 Live (2002) with Otomo Yoshihide's New Jazz Quintet
 Turntables Solo Live, 28 Feb 2002 in Tokyo (2002)
 Soup Live (2004) with Bill Laswell and Yasuhiro Yoshigaki
 Erst Live 004 (2005) with Christian Fennesz, Sachiko M, and Peter Rehberg
 Erst Live 005 (2005) with Keith Rowe, Sachiko M, and Toshimaru Nakamura
 Concert in St. Louis (2005) with Grnr Coleman, Franz Hautzinger, and Sachiko M
 Guitar Solo: 12 October 2004 @ Shinjuku Pit Inn, Tokyo + 1 (2005)
 ONJQ Live in Lisbon (2006) with Otomo Yoshihide's New Jazz Quintet
 Live 1992 (2007) with Ground Zero
 Live Vol. 1: Series Circuit (2007) with Otomo Yoshihide's New Jazz Orchestra
 Live Vol. 2: Parallel Circuit (2007) with Otomo Yoshihide's New Jazz Orchestra

Singles
 Otomo + Mao (1995)
 Revolutionary Pekinese Opera, Version 1.50 (1996) with Ground Zero
 Live Mao '99 (1996) with Ground Zero
 Untitled (1996) with Eye Yamatsuka
 Museum of Towing & Recovery (1998) with Steve Beresford
 Lupin the Third: Ending Theme (1999)
 Split 7" (1999) with Christian Marclay
 Re/cycling Rectangle (2000)
 Digital Tranquilizer Ver. 1.0 (2004)
 Digital Tranquilizer Ver. 1.01 (2004)
 4 Speakers (2009)

DVDs

 Dark Room Filled with Light (2006) with Filament
 Music(s) (2006)
 Ensembles 09: Pre-opening Live at Shinjuku Pit Inn (2009)

As sideman
With Rova::Orchestrova
Electric Ascension (Atavistic, 2005)

Film scores

Film
The Blue Kite (1993)
Summer Snow (1995)
Postman (1995)
Kitchen (1997)
Wait and See (1998)
Kaza-hana (2000)
Blue (2001)
Les Hautes Solitudes: Philippe Garrel Film (2002)
Iden & Tity (2003)
Canary (2005)
Boku wa Imōto ni Koi o Suru (2007)
Ultra Miracle Love Story (2009)
Tokyo Island (2010)
Abraxas (2010)
The Town's Children (2011)
Olo the Boy from Tibet (2012)
Botchan (2012)
Yellow Elephant (2013)
Junan (2013)
Piece of Cake (2015)
Beneath the Shadow (2020)
You've Got a Friend (2022)
Noise (2022)
Inu-Oh (2022)

Television
Amachan (2013)
Idaten (2019)

References

External links 

Sapporo international art festival 2017

1959 births
Avant-garde jazz musicians
Clean Feed Records artists
Electroacoustic improvisation
Free improvisation
Japanese experimental musicians
Japanese film score composers
Japanese male film score composers
Living people
Musicians from Kanagawa Prefecture
Musicians from Yokohama
Peril (band) members
Tzadik Records artists